The Iron Throne is a fantasy novel by Simon Hawke, set in the world of the Birthright, and based on the Dungeons & Dragons role-playing game. It is the first novel published for the setting. It was published in November, 1995.

Plot summary
The Iron Throne is set in a land where humans have tried to create an empire by warring with other races ever since they arrived from another continent. Subjugation of the elven aboriginals, and the bitter feud that ensued, was compounded by the constant threat from the other races who wish to claim the continent as their own. War is inevitable somewhere, and those who have the blood-power in their veins are trained in its arts from youth. Within the human realm, all manner of deceit and treachery is born of the ambition to assume the Iron Throne. Sister is pitted against brother, husband against wife, the crown against ambitious pretender, and civil war is brewing that will encompass the entire continent. Despite their bloody history, the elves form a tenuous alliance with the humans, to fight against the forces of evil spawned of the primordial battle where the gods gave up their lives and the dynasty of the blooded was born.

Reception
Jonathan Palmer reviewed The Iron Throne for Arcane magazine, rating it a 9 out of 10 overall. He describes the novel as "a veritable saga set in a beautifully believable land where humans have vied with other races for empire since their arrival from the ancestral continent." He comments that "The author shows a good understanding of history and geography, of their effects on military campaigns and battlefield strategies, and of the fortifications and defences necessary to withstand attack and siege. Of particular interest to referees will be the impenetrable elven capital." He adds that "Even the erotica is surprisingly well-written by the usual standards of the genre: marriages of political convenience and ill-conceived romantic liaisons of inconvenience abound. There is no respite from the intrigue of court life. The reader feels as though he (or, indeed, she) is a silent servant to the court, observing all the machinations of the courtiers, but at the same time being powerless to intervene. The whole thing is made all the more credible by its generally well-developed characters (even the non-human ones)." Palmer concludes his review by stating, "It has taken a writer who lives alone with his motorcycle on an Indian Reservation in Arizona to have the patience to create such a wonderfully alive fantasy world, with a mythology and captivatingly intricate plot to match. This is a truly splendid read with hardly a weak moment from start to unpredictable end."

Reviews
Review by Don D'Ammassa (1995) in Science Fiction Chronicle, #187 December 1995-January 1996
Backstab #7

References

1995 novels
Birthright (campaign setting) novels
Novels by Simon Hawke